Arış is a village in the Fuzuli District of Azerbaijan.

History 
The village was captured by Armenian forces during the First Nagorno-Karabakh war and all of its original Azerbaijani inhabitants were driven out. It was administrated as part of the Askeran Province of the self-proclaimed Republic of Artsakh. The village was recaptured by Azerbaijan during the 2020 Nagorno-Karabakh war.

References 

Populated places in Fuzuli District